Sotirios or Sotiris is a male given name of Greek origin, meaning "salvation".  Sotiria is the female version of the name. It may refer to:

People

Politicians and statespersons
Sotirios Hatzigakis (born 1944), Greek politician and former government minister
Sotiris Kouvelas (born 1936), Greek politician and former government minister
Sotirios Krokidas (1852–1924), former Prime Minister of Greece
Sotirios Sotiropoulos (1831–1898), former Prime Minister of Greece

Writers and journalists
Soterios Johnson Greek-American radio journalist, host of National Public Radio's Morning Addition for the New York City area on WNYC 
Sotiris Kakisis (born 1954), Greek poet, translator, journalist, lyricist and screenwriter
Sotiris Trivizas (born 1960), Greek poet, essayist and translator

Musicians
Sotiria Bellou (1921–1997), Greek singer and performer of the Greek rebetiko style of music

Actors
Sotiris Moustakas (1940–2007), Greek comic actor born in Cyprus

Sportspersons
Sotiris Balafas (born 1986), Greek footballer
Sotiris Kaiafas (born 1949), retired Cypriot footballer
Sotirios Kyrgiakos (born 1979), Greek footballer
Sotiris Leontiou (born 1984), Greek footballer
Sotiris Liberopoulos, Greek footballer
Sotirios Moutsanas (born 1958), retired Greek middle distance runner
Sotiris Nikolaidis, retired Greek basketball player
Sotiris Ninis (born 1990), Greek footballer
Sotirios Versis (1879–1918), Greek weightlifter and Olympic athlete

Other people
Sotiris Bletsas, Greek architect and Aromanian language activist
Sotiris Kovos (born 1965), Greek automobile designer
Sotirios Panopoulos (1934-2017), inventor of the Hawaiian pizza
Sotiris Xantheas, Laboratory Fellow in the Advanced Computing, Mathematics and Data Division at Pacific Northwest National Laboratory

Other uses
Sotirios, a ship originally named Empire Piper

See also

Greek masculine given names